Wildwood Park Historic District is a national historic district located at Fort Wayne, Indiana.  The district encompasses 190 contributing buildings, 2 contributing sites, and 1 contributing structure in a predominantly residential section of Fort Wayne. The area was developed from about 1914 to 1955, and includes notable examples of Colonial Revival, Tudor Revival, and Bungalow / American Craftsman style residential architecture.  The neighborhood was platted and designed by noted landscape architect Arthur Asahel Shurcliff.

It was listed on the National Register of Historic Places in 2013.

References

Houses on the National Register of Historic Places in Indiana
Historic districts on the National Register of Historic Places in Indiana
Colonial Revival architecture in Indiana
Tudor Revival architecture in Indiana
National Register of Historic Places in Fort Wayne, Indiana
Houses in Fort Wayne, Indiana